Pietro Bucalossi (9 August 1905 – 15 March 1992) was an Italian physician and politician. He is remembered for his cancer research, and for his austerity and small government policies while Mayor of Milan in the 1960s.

Biography

Medical career
Born in San Miniato, Tuscany, Pietro Bucalossi was a graduate in medicine and surgery from the University of Pisa. He became a prominent oncologist and an associate of the National Institute of Cancer (Istituto Nazionale dei Tumori; INT), and moved to Milan in 1934. He was a lifelong member of the "Italian League for the Fight against Cancer", and was also Director of the INT from 1956 to 1974. Additionally, he wrote several medical books with his protégé, Umberto Veronesi.

War record
In 1940, at the beginning of World War II, he began service as a medical captain in the Italian Royal Army. Following the events of 25 July (Benito Mussolini's deposition) in 1943, he left the army and entered both the Italian resistance movement and the National Liberation Committee as a member of the Action Party (Partito d'Azione; PdA). Although a committed partisan, by the end of the war he harboured a profound distrust of the Italian Communist Party (Partito Comunista Italiano; PCI) for its role in concealing the death of Mussolini.

Political career
In 1947, the Action Party disbanded and Bucalossi joined the Socialist Party of Italian Workers (Partito Socialista dei Lavoratori Italiani; PSLI), a breakaway from the Italian Socialist Party (Partito Socialista Italiano; PSI) that later became the Italian Democratic Socialist Party (Partito Socialista Democratico Italiano; PSDI). In 1958 he was elected on the PSDI list to represent Milan in the Chamber of Deputies, where he remained for six years before resigning to become Mayor of Milan in 1964.

Known for his strong personality and short temper, Bucalossi was a sincere believer in small government (despite his party's statist, social-democratic philosophy), similar to that of an American fiscal conservative. He introduced balanced budget and austerity policies, which cut the city administration's spending drastically, and opposed the creation of regional councils, sarcastically dubbing them "parlamentini" ("small parliaments"). However, he also secured enough funding to ensure the opening of several public parks, the expansion of Linate Airport, and the inauguration of the first Milan Metro underground railway line.

In 1967, he resigned as mayor due to a lack of support from his party colleagues, who were discomfited by his opposition to the pact then in place between the PSI and PSDI. He was re-elected a year later to the Chamber of Deputies as a representative of the Italian Republican Party (Partito Repubblicano Italiano; PRI). Bucalossi subsequently became the Minister of Public Works in Aldo Moro's fourth Cabinet from 1974 to 1976, where he introduced a construction permit law that sought to quell the rapid increase in illegal property construction ("abusivismo"). 

In 1977, Bucalossi left the PRI in disagreement over the party's support for abortion, joining the Italian Liberal Party (Partito Liberale Italiano; PLI) soon afterwards. By this stage, he had become a leading critic of the Historic Compromise between the PCI and the Christian Democrats (Democrazia Cristiana; DC), arguing that the experience of having Communists in the governmental majority had brought about a decline in the wellbeing of the country. 

After his time as a deputy came to an end in 1979, he left Italian politics and returned to his job as an oncologist. He died in 1992.

References

External links
 

1905 births
1992 deaths
People from San Miniato
Action Party (Italy) politicians
Italian Democratic Socialist Party politicians
Italian Republican Party politicians
Italian Liberal Party politicians
Deputies of Legislature III of Italy
Deputies of Legislature IV of Italy
Deputies of Legislature V of Italy
Deputies of Legislature VI of Italy
Deputies of Legislature VII of Italy
Mayors of Milan
Politicians of Tuscany
Italian oncologists
University of Pisa alumni
Italian resistance movement members
Knights Grand Cross of the Order of Merit of the Italian Republic